At Midnight (stylized in capital letters) is the third live EP by American contemporary worship band Elevation Worship. The EP was released through Elevation Worship Records on August 30, 2019. The EP was preceded by the release of "See a Victory" as a single on August 9, 2019.

The EP was a commercial success, as it debuted at No. 2 on Billboard'''s Christian Albums chart.

BackgroundAt Midnight came into view when Hallels reported that Elevation Worship would be releasing a new single titled "See a Victory" on August 9, 2019. Chris Brown of Elevation Worship talked about the inspiration behind the EP, saying: 

Singles
"See a Victory" was released in digital format as the lead single to At Midnight on August 9, 2019.

Critical reception

Kevin Davis of NewReleaseToday gave a favourable review of the EP, describing it as "a moving and prayerful worship experience." Jesus Freak Hideout's Michael Weaver described the EP in his four-and-a-half star review as "a really solid modern worship recording."

Accolades

Commercial performance
In the United States, At Midnight launched at No. 149 on the mainstream Billboard 200 chart dated September 14, 2019, and landed at No. 2 on the Billboard'' Christian Albums chart  that same week, with sales amounting to 7,000 equivalent album units. It is their ninth top ten entry on the Christian Albums chart.

Track listing

 Songwriting credits adapted from PraiseCharts.

Charts

Weekly charts

Year-end charts

Release history

References

External links
  on PraiseCharts

2019 EPs
Elevation Worship albums